Dale Alexander (born April 28, 1949) is an American former sprinter.

References

1949 births
Living people
American male sprinters
Athletes (track and field) at the 1971 Pan American Games
Pan American Games gold medalists for the United States
Pan American Games medalists in athletics (track and field)
Medalists at the 1971 Pan American Games